Spring Hill is the name of a ridge in the central part of the city of Somerville, Massachusetts, and the residential neighborhood that sits atop it. It runs northwest to southeast, roughly bounded by Highland Avenue, Somerville Avenue, Elm Street, and Willow Avenue. Summer Street runs along the hill's crest.

Spring Hill is a drumlin, one of many such hills in the Boston area composed of material deposited as glaciers of the Pleistocene epoch receded.

Historically agricultural in character, Spring Hill was sparsely developed until the mid-19th century. Present-day Central, Lowell, and Cedar Streets trace their origins to the mid-17th century, but few other roads broke the open space. Most development took place in the neighborhood between the 1840s and early 1900s. Spring Hill has a fine selection of Greek Revival houses and Victorians including Second Empires, Italianates, Gothic Revivals and Queen Annes. Large houses were built in the neighborhood as well as smaller workers' houses and attached houses. In the early 1900s triple-deckers filled in the remaining land.

Part of the Spring Hill neighborhood was listed on the National Register of Historic Places in 1989. The Spring Hill Historic District stretches from Summer, Central, Atherton and Spring Streets.

History

Spring Hill was first developed in 1843 by George O. Brastow, an influential businessman who later became the first mayor of Somerville. He lotted one of Somerville's first residential subdivisions on the hill's south side between Central and Belmont Streets. Several original houses from this development remain on Atherton Street and off Harvard Street. The well-known Boston surveyor Alexander Wadsworth helped Brastow successfully lay out this subdivision to attract substantial homes on country estates for privileged suburbanites that held proprietary and managerial jobs. Its desirability was reinforced by expansive views of Cambridge and Boston, as well as easy access to Boston via the Fitchburg Railroad.  Brastow's subdivision is the centerpiece of the Spring Hill Historic District, listed on the National Register of Historic Places in 1989.

In 1889, a water standpipe (tower) was erected on the hill between Belmont and Lowell Streets (present-day Bailey Park), making municipal drinking water available to Somerville residents at higher elevations, and so facilitated additional housing development in the city's more elevated areas.

By the end of the 19th century, the street grid had reached its present form, and the neighborhood filled with predominantly multi-family homes. Growth was fueled by the extension of streetcar lines from Lechmere Square and industrialization along Somerville Avenue and the Fitchburg Railroad.

Spring Hill is home to Somerville Hospital, opened in 1891 on Highland Avenue, the Round House, located on Atherton Street, and the Somerville Museum, located on Central Street.

At one time this neighborhood was home to both journalist Howie Carr and Winter Hill Gang leader Howie Winter. They lived one street apart, on Madison Street and Montrose Street, respectively. This was revealed in Carr's book about Irish mobster James "Whitey" Bulger, "The Brothers Bulger."

Architecture and landmarks
There are several structures in Spring Hill that have been listed on the National Register of Historic Places. Spring Hill developed as a primarily residential neighborhood and most of its structures reflect that:

 The Enoch Robinson Round House is a cylindrical, wood-frame residential building on Atherton Street. It was built in 1856 by hardware manufacturer Enoch Robinson, and is considered an offshoot of the octagon house-style popularized by phrenologist Orson Fowler. It has been vacant and deteriorating for many years, but is under new ownership and slowly being restored. 
 The Martin W. Carr School, built in 1898, was originally an elementary school. The building has been converted to condominiums.
 The Alexander Foster House, an Italianate-style house on Laurel Street built in 1860
 The House at 16-18 Preston Road, a Colonial Revival triple-decker built in 1910
 The Joseph K. James House, a Colonial Revival house built in 1893
 The Lemuel Snow Jr. House, a Queen Anne style house built in 1890

See also
Winter Hill
National Register of Historic Places listings in Somerville, Massachusetts

References

External links
 City of Somerville Official Website

Neighborhoods in Somerville, Massachusetts
Historic districts in Middlesex County, Massachusetts
Historic districts on the National Register of Historic Places in Massachusetts
National Register of Historic Places in Somerville, Massachusetts